Albu Obeyd (also Romanized as Ālbū ‘Obeyd and Albū ‘Obeyd) is a village in Hoseyni Rural District, in the Central District of Shadegan County, Khuzestan Province, Iran. At the 2006 census, its population was 714, in 103 families.

References 

Populated places in Shadegan County